Satonda  is an island in West Nusa Tenggara province of Indonesia. It is off the north coast of Sumbawa island. The Island is located in Dompu Regency, 3 km from Sanggar Strait in the Flores Sea and is administratively part of the Nangamiro Village area of Pekat District. Satonda island was formed from the eruption of Mount Satonda thousands of years ago. Satonda volcano is said to be older than Mount Tambora, which is about 30 kilometers from the island. Satonda island has a vast natural coral reefs in the surrounding waters and was designated a Marine Nature Park (TWAL) in 1999 by the Ministry of Forestry of Indonesia. The island is proposed to be part of Moyo Satonda National Park along with neighbouring Moyo Island.

The island draws attention by scientists and researchers from both within and outside the country, as the island is related with the phenomenal  eruption of Mount Tambora which shook the world on 15 April 1815. The eruption of Mount Tambora rocked several parts of the world, spewing dust and polluting the Earth’s atmosphere for many years, even tearing the thin ozone layer. Although estimates vary, the death toll was at least 71,000 people, of which 11,000–12,000 were killed directly by the eruption.  Its effects also resulted in climate change which led to eight weeks of nonstop rain in the UK, and has been cited as a reason for the severity of the 1816–19 typhus epidemic in southeast Europe and the eastern Mediterranean that killed about 65,000 people. 

There is a lake in the middle of the island which has an area of 335 hectares and 86 meter deep. Research by two European scientists named Stephan Kempe and Josef Kazmierczak during 1984, 1989 and 1996 found the water of Satonda Lake as salty with alkaline levels much higher than regular sea water. They jointly concluded that Satonda basin was formed of craters aged more than ten thousand years.

References

Islands of West Nusa Tenggara
Lesser Sunda Islands
Tourism in Indonesia